Megalaemyia is a genus of picture-winged flies in the family Ulidiidae.

Species
 M. albostriata
 M. bestifer
 M. costalis
 M. elsae
 M. fenestellatus
 M. punctulata
 M. radiata

References

Ulidiidae